The Louisville Metro Police Department (LMPD) began operations on January 6, 2003, as part of the creation of the consolidated city-county  government in Louisville, Kentucky, United States. It was formed by the merger of the Jefferson County Police Department and the Louisville Division of Police. The Louisville Metro Police Department has been headed by Jacquelyn Gwinn-Villaroel since January 2, 2023. LMPD divides Jefferson County into eight patrol divisions and operates a number of special investigative and support units. The LMPD is currently under investigation from the United States Department of Justice to assess whether they engaged in a pattern of civil rights abuses.

History 

While the Louisville Metro Police Department began in 2003, its origins lie in two police departments dating back to the 1800s, the Jefferson County Police Department (JCPD) and the Louisville Division of Police (LPD).

Louisville Police Department

The Louisville Police Department, also known as the Louisville Division of Police, came into existence in 1806 with the appointment of five "watchmen" by the town's trustees. In 1821, a captain of the watch was appointed, directly responsible for crime prevention and the apprehension of criminals. The first Sergeant was hired in that year, whose primary duty was to see that the trustees' wishes were carried out.

In 1830, after the city government switched to a mayor-council arrangement, the position of captain was replaced by an elected "Marshall." In 1851, the mayor was put directly over the police. In 1856, a mayor-appointed office of Chief of Police was created, a position that earned $2,000 a year. The next year, the police force was reorganized in the image of modern police departments in the East, with the watchmen being called "policemen."

Following the Civil War, the Kentucky General Assembly passed an act to reorganize the department. The police department was given county-wide jurisdiction. Unfortunately, there was much corruption, as the police department was appointed by the city council. Thus the makeup of the police department depended heavily on the political affiliations of the council members.

Divisions and districting came into use shortly thereafter, with two divisions and several districts (the number depended on the time of day) being established.

In 1891, the department first purchased bicycles to serve with mounted police. The practice of using bicycles would wane throughout the 20th century, but would see a revival in 1993 as they served as an effective alternative to motor vehicles. Three Cadillacs were purchased in November 1908 to address the problem of lawbreakers making getaways in the "horseless carriages." In 1932, the Louisville Police Department began using radios for dispatching units, only the fifth department in the nation to dispatch cars in this manner. Motorcycles were introduced shortly after the cars, but were discontinued in 1984 due to high maintenance costs.

Politics were part of the police department until 1929, when the state's Civil Service act prohibited discrimination on the basis of politics or religion. A Civil Service Board was established, consisting of three members of each political party with the mayor serving as a tiebreaker.

On May 20, 1921, Alice Dunlop became the first female officer in the Louisville Police Department, with Bertha Whedbee becoming the first African American to be a police officer in Louisville. While technically equal with their male counterparts, females were only employed in limited capacities. In 1938, the four policewomen of the Louisville Police Department were dismissed because it was thought that there were no duties which required a woman. A policewoman would next be appointed in 1943, with nine more being appointed in as many years. In 1969, Urania "Kitty" Laun became the department's first sergeant and later appointed lieutenant and the first female district commander.

Decentralization of the department began in 1974. Traffic and detective bureaus remained in the Headquarters Building at Seventh and Jefferson, while other units were placed at various districts.

In 1982, the Louisville Board of Aldermen passed an ordinance allowing the mayor to remove the chief of police for specific reasons. The law was later amended to provide the mayor with the ability to both appoint and remove the chief, following the demotion of Chief Richard Dotson by Mayor Jerry Abramson in 1990.

On March 2, 2002 Louisville Mayor David L. Armstrong fired Police Chief Gene Sherrard due to a banquet honoring officers for exceptional valor. Two officers being honored for facing immediate danger were controversial as to what constituted immediate danger to these officers. The suspect in the case of these two officers, Desmond Rudolph, had left the house the officers went to through the back door and went to a stolen vehicle. Rudolph, who was unarmed, attempted to drive off, but there are conflicting statements as to if the car was operable or not. The view of the policemen involved was that the car was operable and, believing they may be struck by the vehicle, constituted a danger to their lives, while the opposing view is that the policemen did not follow proper police procedure by failing to secure the rear exit and that the car was inoperable and did not pose any danger to the officers. Rudolph was shot by the two officers 22 times and Rudolph died from his wounds. After the firing of the chief of police, many Louisville policemen marched in front of Louisville City Hall to protest the firing of Sherrard and demanded the resignation of Mayor Armstrong.

In 2003 Robert C. White was appointed by Jerry Abramson as the first African-American chief of police in Louisville, KY.

In 2019 LMPD concealed hundreds of thousands of records relating to child sexual abuse by its officers. In response to an inquiry by The Courier-Journal the department said it no longer held any records, when it fact it held at least 738,000 records which were later deleted.

The U. S. Department of Justice on April 26, 2021 issued a press release,  "Attorney General Merrick B. Garland announced today that the Department of Justice has opened a pattern or practice investigation into the Louisville/Jefferson County Metro Government (Louisville Metro) and the Louisville Metro Police Department (LMPD). The investigation will assess all types of force used by LMPD officers, including use of force on individuals with behavioral health disabilities or individuals engaged in activities protected by the First Amendment. The investigation will assess whether LMPD engages in discriminatory policing, and also whether it conducts unreasonable stops, searches, seizures, and arrests, both during patrol activities and in obtaining and executing search warrants for private homes. The investigation will include a comprehensive review of LMPD policies, training, and supervision, as well as LMPD’s systems of accountability, including misconduct complaint intake, investigation, review, disposition, and discipline..."

Jefferson County Police Department

The Jefferson County Police Department was established in February 1868. In 1902, police officers providing their own horses were compensated an extra $10 each month. Two years later, this practice ceased with a wage increase from $40 to $60 monthly for officers. The first chief of police to be granted use of a county car was Harry Kendall in 1918. Following a letter from Chief Ambrose Hagerman noting that there were no river deaths in 1932 due to the introduction of rowboats, the county approved the purchase of a motor boat.

Jefferson County's Special Weapons and Tactics (SWAT) team was formed in 1971. In 1981, JCPD received authorization from the Kentucky Law Enforcement Council to conduct annual in-service training. In 1999, it became certified to conduct its own police academy. At the time of merger, JCPD was divided into four patrol districts: Adam, Baker, Charlie and David.

Merger

During the 1990s, certain specialized elements of the county and city police departments began joint operations. Most notable were the photo and fingerprint labs, the narcotics bureaus and the crimes against children departments. The purpose of this merger was to provide more efficient and cost-effective service.

JCPD and LPD ceased to exist as separate entities on January 6, 2003, when the Louisville Metro Police Department became effective as part of the city-county merger.

Police reform measures 
On June 10, 2020 the Louisville city council voted unanimously to ban no-knock search warrants. The law is called Breonna's Law, in honor of Breonna Taylor who was killed by police during the execution of a no-knock search warrant. (The detectives were granted the no knock exception but the officers executing the search warrant chose not to use it.) The new law requires all officers who serve warrants to wear body cameras and have them turned on from at least five minutes before the warrant is served to at least five minutes after it is served.

On June 18, 2020 Louisville Metro Police Department policy was changed so that all officers will have a new duty to intervene when they see misconduct from their fellow officers. The new standard operating procedure says that officers should act to prevent other officers, "regardless of rank or assignment, from using unlawful or excessive force."

In April of 2021, the United States Department of Justice announced a wide ranging investigation of the LMPD.  The investigation will examine patterns of abuse, including excessive force, unconstitutional stops, searches and seizures, and whether officers discriminate on the basis of race. 

The Justice Department said on March 8, 2023, that there was "reasonable cause to believe" that the Louisville Metro Police Department broke people's civil rights. This was the result of an investigation that started after Breonna Taylor's death.

Controversies
While the Louisville riots of 1968 had many causes (most directly, the spread of false rumors and bottles being thrown into the crowd) the crowd where the riot began had gathered to protest the possible reinstatement of a white officer who had been suspended for beating a black man some weeks earlier. As the crowd became unruly, police attempts to disperse it were ineffective, but this was a common problem police departments of the day had.
In 1982, Michael VonAllmen was arrested and charged with rape and related crimes. After serving eleven years in prison for the crime, he was released on parole. In 2010, courts overruled the conviction.  In 2011, VanAllman sued the police department over the case, claiming misconduct had led to his false conviction.
One of the first and most widely covered controversies faced by the post-merger department was the shooting of Michael Newby on January 3, 2004 in the predominantly black Shawnee neighborhood. Newby, a 19-year-old black male in possession of drugs and a firearm, was shot by McKenzie Mattingly, a white police officer, in what authorities described as an undercover drug deal gone bad. After they struggled and Newby went for Mattingly's gun, Mattingly fired four times, hitting Newby three times in the back, killing him. An internal police investigation found that Mattingly did not face an "immediate threat", although Newby did have a .45-caliber gun in his waistband. Mattingly was fired from the department and charged criminally, but acquitted of all charges in September 2004. The nature of the incident and trial sparked a number of protests and demonstrations by members of the community. The city eventually paid $250,000 to Newby's mother to settle a lawsuit.
On November 6, 2006, the President of the LMPD officers' Fraternal Order of Police Lodge criticized the mayor of Louisville in a 30-second video for his not providing adequate resources to LMPD. In the video, he also endorsed Mayor Abramson's Republican opponent in the 2006 mayoral election. The video implied that the mayor was causing officers to use an outdated and ineffective radio communications system and that he had not hired enough police officers to ensure public safety.
In August 2011, Officer Jerry Lee Coulter pleaded guilty to bankruptcy fraud. He had altered official documents to indicate he could borrow a larger amount than authorized by the court.
In September 2011, the department launched an investigation when a video clip posted on YouTube showed Officer James W. Conley beating a man with a flashlight. In March 2012, a local grand jury refused to indict Officer Conley.
On December 17, 2011, Officer Charles Wheeler saw his girlfriend sit with another man at a local club. He ordered the other man to move and when he refused Wheeler began to beat him. In October 2012, he was charged with fourth-degree assault.
In early September 2012, narcotics Detective Chauncey Carthan got into an altercation at the corner of 24th and Chestnut Streets with an unarmed man. Carthan shot the man in the leg when he refused to get out of his car. Carthan was off-duty and under the influence of alcohol at the time of the shooting. Carthan was charged with driving under the influence, wanton endangerment, and official misconduct. On January 15, 2015, Carthan was acquitted on charges of wanton endangerment, but found guilty of driving under the influence; he was ordered to pay a $500 fine. The official misconduct charge was dismissed prior to trial.
In January 2012, Lieutenant Colonel Settle from the Kentucky Army National Guard, was restrained by Louisville Metro Police officers who thought he was a homeless panhandler; Settle has since filed a lawsuit against the department alleging assault and wrongful detainment.
 In March 2014, a mob of teenagers began a series of attacks in downtown Louisville. Among twenty-plus incidents, a man was knocked down and beaten near the Big Four Bridge, and a large group ransacked a convenience store on South First Street. Although LMPD had deployed extra officers due to the potential for trouble after the death of a juvenile stabbed on a TARC bus several days earlier, the officers were based along West Broadway, away from where the mob attack took place. In the days following the mob incident, residents criticized LMPD for their response. The Downtown Area Patrol was established as a result of the attack and outcry, and led the Louisville and Jeffersonville, Indiana police departments to develop strategies to combat issues at the Big Four Bridge, which connects the two cities via a walking path. The man who stabbed the juvenile was cleared of wrongdoing on self-defense grounds.
 In 2020, Breonna Taylor was shot by police. On May 21, 2020, Louisville Police Chief Steve Conrad announced that he plans to retire effective June 30.
In 2020, business owner David McAtee was shot and killed by the Kentucky Army National Guard and police. On June 1, 2020 Louisville Mayor Greg Fischer announced the immediate firing of Police Chief Steve Conrad.  The FBI and U.S. Attorney's Office were also brought in to investigate McAtee's death.
In November 2020 it was revealed that the LMPD have covered up 738,000 documents relating to sexual abuse against minors perpetrated by two officers.

DOJ investigation
In 2023, the United States Department of Justice announced its findings of the Louisville Metro Police. The report found LMPD used "excessive force" and "unlawfully discriminates against black people." The Investigation found that the "police often cite people for minor offenses, while cases like sexual assault and homicide go unsolved." It was also found police offers would throw their trash at pedestrians, and referred to black people as "monkeys" and "animals".

Organizational structure 

The chief of police is appointed by the Mayor of Louisville Metro. Interim chief Gwinn-Villaroel's command staff consists of two deputy chiefs (Patrol Bureau commander and a chief of staff), two assistant chiefs (Administrative Bureau and Support Bureau), fourteen majors (Special Operations Commander, Special Investigations Division Commander, Major Crimes Division Commander, Narcotics/Intelligence Division Commander, Administrative Services Division Commander, Training Division Commander and eight Patrol Division Commanders) and a civilian attorney serving as the legal advisor.

The Patrol Bureau Commander is responsible for the department's eight patrol divisions and the VIPER Unit. Patrol Bureau also houses the Downtown Area Patrol, a sub-command of the First Division responsible for patrolling Downtown Louisville during select times.  VIPER was established after a high-profile incident in the city.

The chief of staff oversees the Open Records Coordinator's Office, Media and Public Relations, Administrative Bureau, Support Bureau, and the Special Investigations Division.

The Administrative Bureau controls human resources, Training Division, Administrative Services, and the Administrative Services Division, which encompasses Records Management, the Vehicle Impoundment Lot, the Property Room, and Planning and Technology.

The Support Bureau provides oversight for the Narcotics/Intelligence Division, which comprises the Support Unit, Narcotics Street Enforcement Unit, Major Case Investigation Unit, Violent Crime Interdiction Unit, and the Administration Sergeant; the Major Crimes Division, which encompasses the Crimes Against Children, Homicide, Robbery, Special Victims & Financial Crime, and Forensic Investigations Units; and the Special Operations Division, under which is Special Events, Air Patrol/Special Teams Coordinator, Canine Unit, Traffic Unit, and Community Relations.

The Special Investigations Unit oversees the Public Integrity and Professional Standards units. These are equivalent to an internal affairs unit.

Patrol and interdepartmental issues

Before the merger of the city and county police departments, there were six "city" districts (patrolled by LPD) and four "county" districts (patrolled by JCPD). The city districts were identified numerically, while the county districts were labeled using a phonetic alphabet: Adam, Baker, Charlie, David. On October 10, 2004, Jefferson County was divided into eight patrol divisions, each headed by an officer holding the rank of major. The first, second, fourth and fifth divisions roughly comprise the former jurisdiction of the city police department, while the third, sixth, seventh and eighth divisions make up the area formerly patrolled by the county police department. It is common for longtime police officers to refer to a division by the name that area held before merger (e.g., the old fourth district), just as they will sometimes refer to a police officer as being "county" or "city" if they served before merger.

Even after the city-county merger became effective in 2003, Louisville Metro Police did not become the sole law enforcement agency in the county. Other than the Jefferson County Sheriff's Office (JCSO), the incorporated cities remaining intact after merger maintain their own police with jurisdiction within those cities. Most notable of these are the Jeffersontown, Shively and St. Matthews Police Departments. LMPD patrol units do not typically respond to calls for service inside these departments' jurisdictions, and vice versa. Certain LMPD divisions and specialized units provide assistance to these police agencies when necessary.

Communications

Louisville Metro Police communicates using radios on both VHF and UHF frequencies, a carryover from the communications systems of LPD and JCPD. A recent citywide initiative in coordinated operations is MetroSafe, which has combined the radio dispatch capabilities of police, fire and EMS into one joint emergency management unit (Joint EMU). Additionally, MetroSafe has incorporated a Motorola MotoBridge into the system, facilitating communications between different agencies (such as Shively and Jeffersontown Police Departments) with different communications capabilities.

The radio alphabet in use in LMPD is the same one used by the American Radio Relay League, circa 1948, consisting mostly of first names (note: the ARRL currently endorses use of the NATO phonetic alphabet). The alphabet is as follows: Adam, Baker, Charlie, David, Edward, Frank, George, Henry, Ida, John, King, Lincoln, Mary, Nora, Ocean, Paul, Queen, Robert, Sam, Tom, Union, Victor, William, X-ray, Young, Zebra. Until recently, "10-codes" were in common use for radio communications (e.g., "10-23" to indicate arrival on location or "10-86" to indicate situation under control). However, with the National Incident Management System going into effect, encouraging the use of "clear text" to avoid possible miscommunication between agencies using a common radio frequency or working jointly on an incident, the use of 10-codes is being phased out. LMPD has officially ceased using 10-codes as of October 2007, following a SOP update; however, the use of 10-codes by both officers and dispatchers remains common practice.

See also
Shooting of Breonna Taylor
List of law enforcement agencies in Kentucky
 Louisville Division of Fire
 Louisville Metro EMS

References

Sources

External links
 Official LMPD Website
 Metro Mapper - Crime Lab — A comprehensive map of crimes reported in Louisville

Government of Louisville, Kentucky
Municipal police departments of Kentucky
County police departments of Kentucky
Government agencies established in 2003
2003 establishments in Kentucky